Kateřina Kovalová (born 12 December 1978 in Ostrava) is a Czech former ice dancer. With her skating partner, David Szurman, she is the 1999 Ondrej Nepela Memorial silver medalist, the 1999 Karl Schäfer Memorial bronze medalist, the 2000 Golden Spin of Zagreb bronze medalist, and a two-time national champion (2000, 2001). They competed in the final segment at three ISU Championships – the 2000 European Championships in Vienna, Austria; 2001 European Championships in Bratislava, Slovakia; and 2001 World Championships in Vancouver, British Columbia, Canada. In February 2002, they represented the Czech Republic at the 2002 Winter Olympics in Salt Lake City, placing 20th.

Kovalová/Szurman were coached by František Blaťák in Ostrava. Before her partnership with Szurman, she competed with David Blazek.

Programs 
(with Szurman)

Results
GP: Grand Prix; JGP: Junior Series (Junior Grand Prix)

(with David Szurman)

References

External links 
 
 IceDance.com profile

Czech female ice dancers
Olympic figure skaters of the Czech Republic
Figure skaters at the 2002 Winter Olympics
1978 births
Sportspeople from Ostrava
Living people